The Swan 46 Mk I was designed by German Frers and built by Nautor's Swan and first launched in 1983.

External links
 Nautor Swan
 German Frers Official Website

References

Sailing yachts
Keelboats
1980s sailboat type designs
Sailboat types built by Nautor Swan
Sailboat type designs by Germán Frers